Cameron Lawson (born October 7, 1998) is a professional Canadian football defensive tackle for the Winnipeg Blue Bombers of the Canadian Football League (CFL).

Amateur career 
Lawson played U Sports football for the Queen's Gaels from 2016 to 2019. In his final year in 2019, he was named a U Sports Second Team All-Canadian at defensive tackle after recording 15.5 tackles, seven tackles for a loss, 3.5 sacks, and one fumble recovery.

Professional career

Montreal Alouettes 
Lawson was ranked as the 14th best player in the Canadian Football League's Amateur Scouting Bureau final rankings for players eligible in the 2022 CFL Draft, and fourth by players in U Sports. He was then drafted in the second round, 16th overall, in the draft, by the Montreal Alouettes. However, he did not play in 2020 due to the cancellation of both the 2020 CFL season and the 2020 U Sports football season. Instead, it was announced that he had signed with the Alouettes on January 20, 2021, to a rookie contract. Following the team's training camp in 2021, he made the team's roster, but was the team's reserve player for the first three games of the season (did not dress in a game). He played in his first professional game on September 3, 2021, against the Ottawa Redblacks in the Labour Day Classic. He played in four regular season games that year and was on the reserve roster for the other 10 games and the East Semi-Final.

Winnipeg Blue Bombers 
On May 3, 2022, the day of the 2022 CFL Draft, Lawson and the 13th overall pick were traded to the Winnipeg Blue Bombers in exchange for the ninth and 18th overall selections in the draft.

References

External links 
Winnipeg Blue Bombers bio

1998 births
Living people
Canadian football defensive linemen
Montreal Alouettes players
People from Caledon, Ontario
Players of Canadian football from Ontario
Queen's Golden Gaels football players
Winnipeg Blue Bombers players